Squash at the 2007 Southeast Asian Games was held in the Ratchaphruek Club, North Park Golf and Sport Club in Bangkok, Thailand.

Medal winners

External links
Southeast Asian Games Official Results

2007 Southeast Asian Games events
Southeast Asian Games
2007